Steffy Van Den Haute (born 29 November 1993) is a Belgian racing cyclist. In 2015, Van Den Haute finished fourth in Dwars door Vlaanderen.

See also
 List of 2015 UCI Women's Teams and riders

References

External links

1993 births
Living people
Belgian female cyclists
Place of birth missing (living people)
Sportspeople from Aalst, Belgium
Cyclists from East Flanders
21st-century Belgian women